Apertifusus meyeri is a species of sea snail, a marine gastropod mollusc in the family Fasciolariidae, which also includes spindle snails and tulip snails.

Description

Distribution

References

 Vermeij G.J. & Snyder M.A. (2018). Proposed genus-level classification of large species of Fusininae (Gastropoda, Fasciolariidae). Basteria. 82(4-6): 57–82.

External links
 Dunker W. (1858-1871). Novitates Conchologicae. Mollusca Marina. Beschreibung und Abbildung neuer oder wenig gekannter Meeres-Conchylien. Abt. II: Meeres Conchylien. iv + 144 pp., 45 pls. Theodor Fischer, Cassel

meyeri
Gastropods described in 1869